Amnesia (stylized as AMNEƧIA) is a Japanese visual novel series by Idea Factory. It was first released in August 2011, for PlayStation Portable, and then a fan disc in Japan, Amnesia Later, was released in March 2012. Another sequel titled Amnesia Crowd was released in April 2013. They were later combined for a PlayStation Vita release titled "Amnesia Later x Crowd V Edition" in October 2014. A Nintendo Switch port of Amnesia: Memories and Amnesia: Later×Crowd was globally released on September 20, 2022. Due to its positive reception in Japan, it produced various related merchandise such as drama CDs, character music CDs and books. A 2013 anime television series has been produced by Brain's Base.

Gameplay
Amnesia is classified as an otome game; like most otome games, the player takes the role of a female character who can choose from a variety of male characters for her love interest.

In Amnesia, the male characters that the female character can interact with are based on the symbolic suit symbols from a card deck with the following storylines, commonly known as routes: Heart, Spade, Clover, Diamond and Joker. The player's relationship with each character differs depending on which route is chosen. Each route is a parallel world where the heroine seeks to understand more about her selected male character.

The premise to the game is that a sprite called Orion accidentally attaches himself to the Heroine, causing her to lose all her memories. In order for Orion to free himself and return to his own world, the Heroine must regain these memories through interactions with important people and places in her life. Orion acts as her guide, giving her advice and perspective, and providing her with an "inner voice." Orion also serves as the main narrator to the story especially in the later story sequels. 

Like many otome games, the events take place over a fixed time frame and different decision-trees result in accumulation of artwork, stories, and endings with the various characters in the game. However, unlike many games, each route is a parallel world: events that take place in one route may not have happened in another route; the pre-existing relationships the heroine had before amnesia are different in each route; and the relationship-tracking meters may be different from one world to the next.

Characters

Main characters

The heroine of the story who has lost her memories. In the game, Orion follows and supports her throughout each route to regain her memories. She also works part-time at a maid cafe called Meido no Hitsuji.

Shin is a 17-year-old high school student studying hard to get into university. Shin's father accidentally killed a man while under the influence of alcohol, and he was bullied and avoided during his childhood as a result. Only his childhood friends, the heroine and Toma, treated him normally. Shin and Toma can become super competitive with each other, but they have managed to stay friends despite this. Shin is trying to make a successful future for himself to stop people from comparing him with his father. He is the heroine's boyfriend in his route, but has a tendency of being rude and calling her an idiot. He enjoys playing card games and is a member of the track-and-field club. His favorite animals are dogs, and his love for melon soda is evident in the anime, game and several drama CDs. His symbolic route in the game is the 'Heart' route.

Ikki is 22 years old and a fourth year university student.  He is best friends with Kent and has a 19-year-old younger sister (in the game).  Ikki's hobbies include playing darts, billiards, and table tennis, as well as solving Kent's math puzzles.  He is notably skilled at 'anything requiring him to use his hands'.  His favorite animals are apparently hamsters. When he was a kid he wished on a shooting star for girls to like him and was granted with eyes that make him irresistible to any woman. However as time passed, he began to think of it as a curse. These eyes, however, do not affect the heroine, which is why he falls in love with her on his route. Ikki is always surrounded by girls and has a fan club that would do literally anything for him to be theirs – they bully the heroine often due her being close to him. He dates women for three months before they break up with him due to his fan club having the rule of sharing him and only allowing club members to date him for three months, though he is unaware of this. His symbolic route in the game is the 'Spade' route.

Kent is a 25-year-old university graduate and Ikki's best friend. His interests include devising math puzzles for Ikki and observing things. His parents raised him with the belief that everything has some sort of logical conclusion, thus he believes anything can be solved using logic. He often uses this logic to advise Ikki, who then uses his dexterity and leadership skills to act on Kent's advice.  Kent came to know the heroine through being her tutor. On his route, he has a hard time showing his feelings for the heroine.  His symbolic route in the game is the 'Club' route.

Toma is a 19-year-old at his second year at university.  He is a childhood friend of both Heroine and Shin, and acts as an older brother figure to both. He loves the heroine but has a Yandere personality in a few routes. In addition to being in a number of school clubs, including soccer, broadcasting, archery, and the newspaper, Toma enjoys playing basketball, cycling, surfing the internet, playing video games, cooking and reading.  His symbolic route in the game is the 'Diamond' route. Toma is revealed to love the heroine in two of the worlds (Shin's and his routes).

Ukyō is a 24-year-old photographer with a split personality who seems to know the heroine, but remains distant. He is in a lot of different clubs: triathlon, cheerleading, hula dance, soccer, lacrosse, rugby, kabaddi, dance, art, riding, debate and more. His symbolic route in the game is the 'Joker' route. It is revealed in this route that he made a wish to Orion's superior Nhil, asking for the heroine to live, and thus he has to die on every route where she survives, as they can't live together on the same world.

Others

A fairy who came from a completely different world. From a human's point-of-view, he appears as a twelve-year-old young boy wearing eccentric clothing. He instigates events of the story by dislodging all of the Heroine's memories. No one can see or hear him but the heroine and can only travel a 10m radius while attached to her.

A female university student with a bright and sporty personality. She is the heroine's best friend and is hinted to have a crush on Shin. She speaks in a very lively way, but is someone one you can rely on. In Ikki's route, she does not work at the cafe, but she is still good friends with the heroine. 

The heroine's kōhai at the place where she works part-time. She has a crush on Ikki in most of the routes, but she likes Waka in Kent's route.

A mysterious woman who dresses in "sophisticated" clothes. She is the head of the Ikki fan club. Rika is well mannered, but is terribly cold towards the heroine in most of the routes.

The manager at the place where the heroine works part-time. He is a wise businessman who holds a firm policy. It appears that he has a habit of being too devoted to the ideologies he believes in, and outwardly, he has a little bit of a blown-away behaviour. In the game, Waka has a different personality depending on the player's route.

Luka is a mysterious individual and plays an important role in Amnesia Crowd. Later it is revealed that he is older brother of Rika.

Media

Anime

During Otome Party 2012, production of an anime television adaptation was announced with an expected broadcast in 2013. The opening theme is "Zoetrope" by Nagi Yanagi and the ending theme is "Recall" by Ray. The series aired from January 7, 2013 to March 25, 2013 and was animated by Brains Base.

Reception

The anime adaptation of Amnesia was generally poorly received. Anime News Network's Rebecca Silverman gave the first half a C grade overall, commenting "Parts of it are fascinating...while other parts are intensely annoying", and said the show "basically feels like watching someone else play the game." Matthew Lee, writing for Twitch Film, opined that Amnesia'''s "story offers nothing of any interest beyond the burning question of what the hell any of it means." Seb Reid of UK Anime Network rated it 4 out of 10 and called it "A show that is best forgotten." Silverman gave the second half an overall grade of D, saying that "Ultimately Amnesia'' ends as it began – fascinating in the same way a loose tooth is, but the payout when you finally get rid of it doesn't feel like enough."

References

Amnesia Memories European release 26–08–15

External links
 Official anime website 
 Amnesia Video Game Portal Site (PSP) 
 Amnesia Later (PSP) 
 Amnesia Crowd (PSP) 
 Amnesia: V Edition (Vita) 
 Amnesia World (Vita) 
 
 
 
 
 

2011 video games
2012 video games
2013 video games
2014 video games
2013 anime television series debuts
Anime television series based on video games
Brain's Base
Idea Factory franchises
NBCUniversal Entertainment Japan
Otome games
Male harem anime and manga
PlayStation Portable games
PlayStation Vita games
Romance video games
Sentai Filmworks
Video games developed in Japan
Visual novels
Windows games
AT-X (TV network) original programming